The Laois Junior Football Championships are the lower-tier Laois Club Football Championships.

The Junior A and Junior B Championships use group phases then down to eight-four-two and the Junior C Championship operates similarly to the Senior Championship and Intermediate Championship by going for a straight knockout.

Portlaoise are the title holders (2022) defeating Barrowhouse in the Final.

Laois Junior Football Championship

The Laois Junior Football Championship is an annual Gaelic football competition contested by lower-tier Laois GAA clubs.

Portlaoise are the title holders (2022) defeating Barrowhouse in the Final.

Honours
The trophy presented to the winners is the Shaw Cup.

The winners of the Laois Junior Championship qualify to represent their county in the Leinster Junior Club Football Championship. The winners can, in turn, go on to play in the All-Ireland Junior Club Football Championship. They often do well outside the county, with the likes of Rosenallis (2016) and Park–Ratheniska (2006) among the clubs from Laois to win at least one Leinster Championship after winning the Laois Junior Football Championship. The winners enter the All-Ireland at the quarter-final stage, unless drawn against the British champions in the quarter-finals.

History
The Laois Junior A Football Championship was first held in 1906, with Durrow the victors.

In the mid-1990s, Rosenallis won the Junior Championship and then went on to win the Intermediate Championship back-to-back.

Laois full-back Martin Dempsey played in the 2004 final, at centre-forward.

In 2016, Rosenallis won a dual championship — junior football and intermediate hurling.

Laois players Tom Kelly (2003 All Star and 2005 International Rules Series Player of the Series) and Noel Garvan (who also won a Leinster Senior Football Championship in 2003) were involved in the 2017 final.

List of finals

Laois Junior B Football Championship
The Laois Junior B Football Championship is an annual Gaelic football competition contested by fourth grade Laois GAA clubs. ? are the title holders (2022) defeating ? in the Final.

The trophy presented to the winners is the Chris Lalor Cup.

The COVID-19 pandemic delayed the completion of the 2020 Laois Junior B Football Championship until the second half of 2021. The semi-finals were played in October 2020. The final was played in August 2021.

List of finals

Laois Junior C Football Championship
The Laois Junior C Football Championship is an annual Gaelic football competition contested by fifth grade Laois GAA clubs. Rathdowney are the title holders (2022) defeating Courtwood in the Final.

An actor participated in the 2020 Junior C Championship.

List of finals

References

3